Lightning Creek is a stream in the U.S. state of South Dakota.

Some say the creek takes its name from nearby Lightning Mountain, while others believe the creek so named on account of frequent storms over it.

See also
List of rivers of South Dakota

References

Rivers of Custer County, South Dakota
Rivers of South Dakota